Roberto Maytín and Fernando Romboli were the defending champions but only Romboli chose to defend his title, partnering Miguel Ángel Reyes-Varela.

Romboli successfully defended his title, defeating Diego Hidalgo and Skander Mansouri 7–5, 4–6, [10–2] in the final.

Seeds

Draw

References

External links
 Main draw

2021 ATP Challenger Tour